Meadowdale High School is part of Dayton City Schools. Located in Harrison Township, near Dayton, Ohio, United States, it serves approximately 1000 students. The school mascot is the lion.

About

Meadowdale did not meet any of the 12 state indicators for the 2007–2008 school year remaining in "Academic Watch" rating.
.

Clubs and activities
National Honor Society
Student Council

Notable alumni

Tonja Buford-Bailey, USA Track & Field athlete
Derek Bunch, former NFL linebacker
Irv Eatman, USFL, NFL, UCLA tackle
Melissa Fay Greene, author
Andy McCullough, Arena Football League wide receiver
Stephen Nichols, actor, General Hospital and more
Aaron Patrick, NFL outside linebacker
Mike Pratt, University of Kentucky basketball
Peerless Price, National Football League wide receiver
Derrick Shepard, professional football player and coach
Rick Smith, Houston Texans general manager
Sheldon White, National Football League cornerback
Steve Yeager (born 1948), Los Angeles Dodgers catcher

References

External links
 MeadowdaleWebsite

High schools in Dayton, Ohio
Public high schools in Ohio
1961 establishments in Ohio